KNKC-LD, virtual and UHF digital channel 29, is a low-powered Estrella TV-affiliated television station licensed to Lubbock, Texas, United States. Owned by DTV America Corporation, it is a sister station to fellow Estrella TV affiliate KLKW-LD (channel 22) in Amarillo.

History
KNKC-LD's application dates back to May 17, 2011, though it did not sign on until January 21, 2014. The station's original callsign was K29KC-D, which was changed to the current callsign of KNKC-LD on March 11, 2013.

Digital channels
The station's digital signal is multiplexed:

Estrella TV is the station's primary affiliation on their main channel, 29.1. 29.2 carried Doctor TV, a healthy lifestyle network, until December 2015, when it was replaced by GetTV. That year, a third subchannel was launched to carry the Sonlife Broadcasting Network.

References

External links
DTV America
Dr. TV website 
Estrella TV 
Query the FCC’s TV station database for KNKC-LD 
KNKC-LD LUBBOCK, TX at RabbitEars.Info

Television channels and stations established in 2014
Low-power television stations in the United States
Television stations in Lubbock, Texas
2014 establishments in Texas
Innovate Corp.